Bohdan Skaradziński (pen names Jan Brzoza, Kazimierz Podlaski; 5 January 1931 – 4 May 2014) was a Polish writer and social activist.

Born in Osowiec, between 1952 and 1956 he was repressed by the Stalinist government of People's Republic of Poland.

For many years, he was the editor of the monthly "Więź". After 1989 he edited a section of "Tygodnik Białostocki", entitled "Sprawy Pobratymcze" (Among brothers). His works focused on the twentieth century history of Poland in particular, the relations between Poles and their eastern neighbors.

He was awarded the Solidarity award for the book "Belarusians, Lithuanians and Ukrainians" (1985) and the Jerzy Łojek Award for the book "Polish Year 1919" (1989).

He was awarded the Solidarity award for the book "Belarusians, Lithuanians and Ukrainians" (1985) and the Jerzy Łojek Award for the book "Polish Year 1919" (1989).

With his wife he had a son and a daughter.

He lived and died in Podkowa Leśna.

References

Polish male writers
1931 births
2014 deaths